The 8th Kalasha TV & Film Awards ceremony, presented by the Kenya Film Commission (KFC), will honor the best Kenyan films of 2018 and will take place at the Safari Park Hotel, along Thika Road, in Nairobi, Kenya. The ceremony will be held on November 24, 2018. During the ceremony, the Kenya Film Commission will present Kalasha Awards in 16 categories which include Best Feature Film, Best Original Score, Best Short Film, Best Director of Photography, Best Editor, Best Documentary and Best Local Language Film.

Schedule

Nominees Overview

Best Feature Film
 Supa Modo, by Siobhain Ginger Wilson
 Disconnect, by Mueke Iman
 Subira,  Ravneet Sippy Chadha
 World Tofauti, by Kangethe Mungai
 The Cut, by Peter Wangugi Gitau

Best Original Score
 Clench- Life of a Creative, by Mark Ayabei
 Supa Modo, by Sean Peevers
 Seredo 2, by Ryez Music
 World Tofauti, by H-art The Band (Penya Africa)
 The Cut, by Kelvin Ngaira

Best Short Film
 Wavamizi, by Kiboi Kuria
 Embraced, by Stephen Ochogo
 Beautiful Disaster, by Damaris Matunda
 Poacher, by Davina Leonard
 Trap, by John JJ Jumbi

Best Original Screenplay
 Supa Modo, by Mugambi Nthiga
 Embraced, by Stephen Ochodo
 Subira, by Ravneet Sippy Chadha
 World Tofauti, by Kangethe Mungai
 The Cut, by Peter Wangugi

Best Local Language Film
 Seredo 2, by Robin Odongo
 World Tofauti, by Kang’ethe Mungai
 The Cut, by Peter Wangugi Gitau
 Subira, by Ravneet Sippy Chadha
 Supa Modo, by Siobhain Ginger Wilson

References

External links

Official websites

 
 

2018 film awards
Kenyan film awards